The 1978 NCAA Division I-A football season was the first season of Division I-A college football; Division I-A was created in 1978 when Division I was subdivided into Division I-A and Division I-AA for football only. With the exception of seven teams from the Southwestern Athletic Conference (SWAC), Division I teams from the 1977 season played in Division I-A during the 1978 season. The SWAC teams, along with five conferences and five other teams formerly in Division II, played in Division I-AA.

The Division I-A season came down to a rare No. 1 vs. No. 2 post-season meeting as No. 1 Penn State and No. 2 Alabama met in the New Year's Day Sugar Bowl. The game is most remembered for Alabama's goal line stand with four minutes left in the game. On fourth down and a foot, Alabama managed to keep Penn State out of the end zone and went on to win, 14–7. Keith Jackson, who did the play by play for ABC, called it the greatest game he'd ever seen. 76,824 people packed the Louisiana Superdome, which was tremendously loud.

Alabama's only loss that year was 24–14 in Birmingham to USC. Both schools claim this year as a national title year.  Alabama claimed the national title because it defeated top-ranked Penn State on the field.  USC claimed the title because it defeated Alabama in the regular season and also finished with only one loss.  The AP Poll and most other voting outlets (including the Football Writers Association of America and the National Football Foundation) crowned Alabama as national champion, while the UPI Coaches' Poll selected USC.

Rules changes
Unsuccessful field goals are returned to the previous line of scrimmage. Previously they were placed at the 20-yard line. Unsuccessful attempts where the previous line of scrimmage was inside the 20 are placed at the 20.
Balls may not be altered and new or nearly new balls are to be used.
Receivers knocked out of bounds by a defender can return and catch a legal forward pass.
Intentional grounding is defined as a pass thrown with the intent of avoiding loss of yardage that lands where no eligible receivers are located.
Players whose jerseys are torn are required to leave the field for one play to change or a time-out will be charged to his team.
The penalty for an ineligible receiver touched by a forward pass is reduced from 10 yards and loss of down to 5 yards and loss of down.
Delay of game (5 yards) penalties can be assessed against the defense when crowd noise prevents the offense from running its plays.

Conference and program changes

New conferences
After adding Arizona and Arizona State from the WAC, the Pacific-8 Conference was renamed the Pacific-10 Conference.

Membership changes

Program changes
 University of Oregon Webfoots officially changed their nickname to the now-eponymous Ducks.

September
The pre-season ranking of the top five teams was No. 1 Alabama, No. 2 Arkansas, No. 3 Penn State, No. 4 Oklahoma, and No. 5 Notre Dame.

On September 2, No. 1 Alabama avenged its only loss from the prior season when they topped No. 10 Nebraska, 20–3. No. 2 Arkansas would not start its season for another two weeks. No. 3 Penn State struggled in beating Temple 10–7. No. 4 Oklahoma was idle, as was No. 5 Notre Dame. With relatively few games played this week, the AP did not issue a new poll.

On September 9, No. 1 Alabama and No. 2 Arkansas were not scheduled, while No. 3 Penn State beat Rutgers, 26–10. No. 4 Oklahoma opened its season with a 35–29 win at Stanford, but No. 5 Notre Dame was stunned at Missouri, 3–0. No. 6 Michigan, which had yet to begin its season, replaced Notre Dame in the top five: No. 1 Alabama, No. 2 Arkansas, No. 3 Oklahoma, No. 4 Michigan, and No. 5 Penn State.

September 16 saw No. 1 Alabama win at No. 11 Missouri, 38–20, while No. 2 Arkansas opened its season with a 48–17 win over Vanderbilt. No. 3 Oklahoma walloped West Virginia 52–10, and No. 4 Michigan started its campaign with a 31–0 shutout of Illinois. No. 5 Penn State blanked No. 6 Ohio State 19–0 and moved up to tie Oklahoma in the next poll: No. 1 Alabama, No. 2 Arkansas, No. 3 Penn State, No. 3 Oklahoma, and No. 5 Michigan.

On September 23, No. 1 Alabama lost in Birmingham to No. 7 USC, 24–14. No. 2 Arkansas struggled in beating Oklahoma State 19–7, and No. 3 Penn State also had a difficult time with SMU but won 26–21. No. 3 Oklahoma had a much more dominant performance with a 66–7 victory over Rice, earning them the top spot in the next poll. No. 5 Michigan won at No. 14 Notre Dame, 28–14. The new poll was No. 1 Oklahoma, No. 2 Arkansas, No. 3 USC, No. 4 Michigan, and No. 5 Penn State.

On September 30, new No. 1 Oklahoma beat No. 14 Missouri 45–23. No. 2 Arkansas was unimpressive in a 21–13 win over Tulsa, but No. 3 USC thumped Michigan State 30–9, No. 4 Michigan beat Duke 52–0, and No. 5 Penn State crushed TCU 58–0. The next poll featured No. 1 Oklahoma, No. 2 USC, No. 3 Michigan, No. 4 Arkansas, and No. 5 Penn State.

October
On October 7, No. 1 Oklahoma solidified its ranking with a 31–10 win over No. 6 Texas. No. 2 USC was idle, No. 3 Michigan struggled in beating Arizona 21–17, No. 4 Arkansas beat TCU 42–3, and No. 5 Penn State avenged its only loss from 1977 in shutting out Kentucky, 30–0. The latter two teams were tied in the next poll: No. 1 Oklahoma, No. 2 USC, No. 3 Penn State, No. 3 Arkansas, and No. 5 Michigan.

October 14 was a day of surprises. No. 1 Oklahoma escaped with a 17–16 win over Kansas, No. 2 USC lost to Arizona State in Tempe 20–7, and No. 5 Michigan lost to Michigan State, 24–15. No. 3 Penn State and No. 4 Arkansas escaped the madness by being idle. Moving up were No. 7 Alabama, which beat Florida 23–12, and No. 8 Nebraska, which defeated Kansas State 48–14. The next poll featured No. 1 Oklahoma, No. 2 Penn State, No. 3 Arkansas, No. 4 Alabama, and No. 5 Nebraska.

October 21 saw No. 3 Arkansas lose to No. 8 Texas 28–21. This week the other top-ranked teams were more successful, as No. 1 Oklahoma beat Iowa State 34–6, No. 2 Penn State won over Syracuse 45–14, No. 4 Alabama beat Tennessee 30–13, and No. 5 Nebraska won at Colorado 52–14. No. 6 Maryland jumped into the top five with a 39–0 win over Wake Forest: No. 1 Oklahoma, No. 2 Penn State, No. 3 Alabama, No. 4 Nebraska, and No. 5 Maryland.

On October 28, No. 1 Oklahoma beat Kansas State 56–19, No. 2 Penn State beat West Virginia 49–21, No. 3 Alabama beat Virginia Tech 35–0, No. 4 Nebraska beat Oklahoma State 22–14, and No. 5 Maryland got ready for their upcoming showdown with Penn State by thumping Duke 27–0. The top five remained the same.

November
On November 4, No. 1 Oklahoma beat Colorado 28–7 to improve its record to 9−0. In a matchup of the only other undefeated teams, No. 2 Penn State stymied No. 5 Maryland 27–3. No. 3 Alabama topped Mississippi State 35–14, and No. 4 Nebraska beat Kansas 63–21. No. 6 USC moved up after a 13–7 win at Stanford: No. 1 Oklahoma, No. 2 Penn State, No. 3 Alabama, No. 4 Nebraska, and No. 5 USC.

November 11 saw No. 1 Oklahoma lose to No. 4 Nebraska 17–14, allowing the Cornhuskers to clinch at least a share of the Big Eight title. No. 2 Penn State claimed the top spot with a 19–10 win over North Carolina State. No. 3 Alabama rolled along with a 31–10 win at No. 10 LSU. No. 5 USC beat No. 19 Washington 28–10. The new poll featured No. 1 Penn State, No. 2 Nebraska, No. 3 Alabama, No. 4 Oklahoma, and No. 5 USC.

On November 18, No. 1 Penn State and No. 3 Alabama were idle. No. 2 Nebraska was knocked off at home by Missouri 35–31 and fell out of the top five, while No. 4 Oklahoma won its final game over Oklahoma State 62–7. This left the Cornhuskers and Sooners in a tie atop the Big Eight, but Nebraska's head-to-head victory earned them a spot in the Orange Bowl. In the showdown to decide the Pac-10 title and Rose Bowl berth, No. 5 USC stopped No. 14 UCLA by a score of 17–10. No. 6 Houston, which was idle this week but stood atop the SWC standings after upset victories over Arkansas and Texas, moved into the top five: No. 1 Penn State, No. 2 Alabama, No. 3 USC, No. 4 Oklahoma, and No. 5 Houston.

On November 24, No. 1 Penn State wrapped up its undefeated regular season with a 17–10 win over their rival, No. 15 Pittsburgh. No. 2 Alabama had one more week off before its game with rival Auburn. No. 3 USC needed a controversial call (an apparent fumble was ruled an incomplete pass thus keeping the final drive alive) and last second field goal to beat No. 8 Notre Dame 27–25. No. 5 Houston was upset by Texas Tech 22–21, but the Cougars still clinched the SWC title and a Cotton Bowl berth when the other contender, No. 9 Texas, also lost. For once, Michigan and Ohio State were not the only contenders for the Big Ten title, as No. 14 Michigan State stood in a three-way tie with the two traditional powerhouses; the Spartans even held the head-to-head advantage over Michigan. However, Michigan State was banned from the postseason due to recruiting violations, meaning that the Michigan-Ohio State game would yet again determine the conference's representative in the Rose Bowl. In the final battle of "The Ten Year War", the No. 6-ranked Wolverines clinched a trip to Pasadena with a 14–3 win over the No. 16 Buckeyes. The next poll featured No. 1 Penn State, No. 2 Alabama, No. 3 USC, No. 4 Oklahoma, and No. 5 Michigan.

December
On December 2, No. 2 Alabama needed a victory in the Iron Bowl to clinch the SEC title and a Sugar Bowl berth, which would go to No. 11 Georgia (currently half a game behind them in conference play) if they lost. The Crimson Tide came through with a 34–16 win over rival Auburn, and the top five remained unchanged from the previous week.

No. 1 Penn State accepted the Sugar Bowl bid to set up a 1 vs. 2 matchup with Alabama. No. 3 USC and No. 5 Michigan would square off in a Rose Bowl battle of one-loss teams. The Orange Bowl normally pitted the Big Eight champion against an independent team or one from another conference, but this year the organizers set up a rematch between No. 6 Nebraska and No. 4 Oklahoma (which lost the Big Eight title to the Cornhuskers in a close game, but had a better overall record and ranking). The Cotton Bowl rounded out the major games with a matchup between No. 9 Houston and No. 10 Notre Dame. No. 7 Clemson was passed over by the New Year's bowls despite a 10−1 record and the ACC championship, but their Gator Bowl contest with No. 20 Ohio State turned out to be much more significant in hindsight. It was near the end of that game when legendary Ohio State coach Woody Hayes punched Clemson linebacker Charlie Bauman after his game clinching interception, leading to Hayes' dismissal as Ohio State coach.

Conference standings

No. 1 and No. 2 progress

Notable rivalry games
 Arizona St. 18, Arizona 17
 Alabama 34, Auburn 16
 Stanford 30, Cal 10
 USC 17, UCLA 10 
 USC 27, Notre Dame 25
 Nebraska 17, Oklahoma 14

Bowls

Bowl bids
Top ranked Penn State, as an independent, was not tied to any bowl game so the Nittany Lions accepted the Sugar Bowl invitation where they would meet SEC Champion Alabama, who was ranked 2nd in the AP and 3rd in the UPI. Pac-10 champion USC (ranked 3rd in the AP and 2nd in the UPI) faced No. 5 Michigan in the Rose Bowl in a battle of one loss teams.  Nebraska had upset Oklahoma to earn the Big 8 title and automatic Orange Bowl berth; the Orange Bowl pulled a surprise by inviting the Sooners to play Nebraska in a rematch. Most observers felt Clemson would be invited and Oklahoma would play Houston in the Cotton Bowl Classic. The Cotton Bowl Classic bid went to Notre Dame and Clemson had to settle for the Gator Bowl despite a better record and higher ranking than Notre Dame.

Bowl results
In unusually cold and icy Dallas, Notre Dame overcame a 34–12 fourth quarter deficit to beat Houston 35–34.  The Fighting Irish were led by quarterback Joe Montana in his final collegiate game. In New Orleans, Alabama used a 4th quarter goal line stand to upset Penn State 14–7. In Pasadena, USC defeated Michigan  aided by an incredible performance (including the game-winning touchdown) by Charles White . In the Orange Bowl, Oklahoma won its rematch with Nebraska  One other Bowl of note saw Clemson beat Ohio State  in the Gator Bowl; the next day, legendary Ohio State coach Woody Hayes was fired for punching Clemson defensive back Charlie Bauman in the throat after his game-saving interception.

National champion
The season ended with the top 3 teams (Alabama, USC, and Oklahoma) with one loss. In the AP poll, Alabama (11–1–0), on the strength of their Sugar Bowl win over former No. 1 Penn State, was voted No. 1. In the UPI poll, USC (12–1–0) was voted No. 1, based in a large part on their 24–14 win at Alabama over the Crimson Tide.  Oklahoma, who was No. 1 for most of the season, felt that they should be national champs as they avenged their only loss by beating Nebraska in the Orange Bowl. The Sooners had to settle for the No. 3 ranking in both polls.

Final AP and UPI rankings

Heisman Trophy voting
The Heisman Trophy is given to the year's most outstanding player

Source:

Other major awards
 Maxwell (outstanding player) – Chuck Fusina, Penn St. QB
 Outland (Interior Lineman) – Greg Roberts, Oklahoma G
 Camp (Running back) – Billy Sims, Oklahoma RB
 Lombardi (Linebacker) – Bruce Clark, Penn St. D

References